South Bank is a railway station on the Tees Valley Line, which runs between  and  via . It is owned by Network Rail and managed by Northern Trains.

History
The first station, initially named Eston, was built in 1853 by the Middlesbrough and Redcar Railway. On 1 May 1882, this was replaced by an island platform by the North Eastern Railway, to serve the growing town of South Bank. Ironically, this was located on the same site as the present station.

The 1882 station was closed on the same day that its replacement opened. It survived intact, but derelict for many years thereafter. It has since been demolished to allow the down (eastbound) line through the site to be realigned.

In July 1984, British Rail opened the current station to the west, as the previous station was inconveniently sited in a heavily industrialised area, and in the way of a planned new dockside access road.

The closure of the earlier station was closely followed by nearby Cargo Fleet on 22 January 1990, and Grangetown on 25 November 1991.

Facilities
Station facilities here have recently been improved as part of the Tees Valley Metro project. The package for this station included new fully lit waiting shelters, renewed station signage and the installation of CCTV. The long-line Public Address system (PA) has been renewed and upgraded with pre-recorded train announcements.

The station usage estimates of 2014 and 2015 also make note of the fact that the service improvement has increased the patronage substantially enough to be in the top ten most percentage increase of passenger numbers across the whole of the United Kingdom.

Services

As of the May 2021 timetable change, the station is served by an hourly service between Saltburn and Bishop Auckland via Darlington. All services are operated by Northern Trains.

Rolling stock used: Class 156 Super Sprinter and Class 158 Express Sprinter

References

External links

Railway stations in Redcar and Cleveland
DfT Category F2 stations
Railway stations in Great Britain opened in 1882
Railway stations in Great Britain closed in 1984
Railway stations opened by British Rail
Railway stations in Great Britain opened in 1984
Northern franchise railway stations